A Chinese school is a school outside China teaching Chinese language and culture.

Chinese school may also refer to:

 Education in China
 an institute teaching Chinese as a foreign language

See also
 Confucius Institute, partnerships between colleges and universities in China and those in other countries
 Buxiban, cram schools in China
 Bǔ kè, the social phenomenon of extra study in China